Tetro is a surname. Notable people with the surname include:

Cydni Tetro, American CEO, speaker, and serial entrepreneur
Sara Tetro (born 1969), New Zealand model, television host, actress, and entrepreneur
Tony Tetro (born 1950), American art forger

See also
Petro